The 1924 British Isles tour to South Africa was the tenth tour by a British Isles team and the fifth to South Africa. The tour is retrospectively classed as one of the British Lions tours, as the Lions naming convention was not adopted until 1950. As well as South Africa, the tour included a game in Salisbury in Rhodesia, in what would become present day Harare in Zimbabwe.

Tour history

Led by 's Ronald Cove-Smith and managed by former  international Harry Packer, the tour took in 21 matches. Of the 21 games, 17 were against club or invitational teams and four were Test matches against the South African national team. The British Isles lost three and drew one of the Test matches making it one of the least successful Lions tours to South Africa – the 1962 and 1968 tourists also lost their Test series three matches to nil with one draw. The tourist also suffered badly in the non-Test games losing six and drawing one, including a run where they failed to win over an eight-match period.

Several reasons have been put forward regarding the poor performance of the British Isles. The team itself was fairly unrepresentative of the best the home nations could have supplied, during a period where British rugby wasn't in its finest phase. The team also suffered from a heavy attrition rate to injury attributed to the very dry South African playing pitches; conditions that once suited British back play, and were so short of players during some periods the team was forced to use players in foreign positions.

On their return at least two of the players on the tour, Roy Kinnear and Thomas Holliday went on to become dual code rugby internationals after they switched to rugby league.

The match against Orange Free State Country was a peculiar match with the home team being much weaker. Fortune shone upon the home team though, when they won the toss and decided to play with a howling wind on their backs. Half time, the wind died down and proceeded to blow with the same vengeance in the opposite direction. This advantage was enough to ensure a 6–0 win for the home side.

Touring party
 Manager: Harry Packer

Full Backs
D Drysdale (Heriots FP and )
W.F. Gaisford (St. Bart's Hospital)
T.E. Holliday (Aspatria)

Three-Quarters
Rowe Harding (Swansea)
Ian Smith (Oxford University and )
Stanley "Stan" Wakefield Harris (Blackheath)
William "Bill" Wallace (Percy Park)
Roy Kinnear (Heriots FP and )
J.H. Bordass (Cambridge University)
Reginald "Reg" Bellamy Maxwell (Birkenhead Park)

Half backs
Harold Davies (Newport)
Vince Griffiths (Newport)
Herbert Waddell (Glasgow Academicals and )
Bill Cunningham (Lansdowne)
Arthur Young (Blackheath)
Herbert Whitley (Northern)

Forwards
R. Cove-Smith (Old Merchant Taylors) (captain)
Arthur Frederick "Freddie" Blakiston (Blackheath)
A. Thomas "Tom" Voyce (Gloucester)
Neil McPherson (Newport)
R.G. Henderson (Northern and )
K.G.P. Hendrie (Heriots FP and )
D.S. Davies (Hawick and )
R.A. Howie (Kirkcaldy RFC and )
Douglas Marsden-Jones (Cardiff and London Welsh)
Andrew Ross (Kilmarnock and )
James Daniel Clinch (Dublin University)
William Roche (UCC and Newport)
Jim McVicker (Collegians)
Michael Bradley (Dolphin)
 Norman Brand (North of Ireland FC)

 Ian Smith and Roy Muir Kinnear had not been capped by Scotland at the time of the 1924 tour.

Results
Complete list of matches played by the British Isles in South Africa:

 Test matches

Bibliography

References

British Lions tour
tour
tour
tour
tour
British & Irish Lions tours of South Africa
Rugby union tours of Zimbabwe
1924 in South African rugby union